Eugénio Salessu (23 August 1923 – 20 January 2011) was the Catholic bishop of the Roman Catholic Diocese of Malanje, Angola.

Ordained to the priesthood in 1957, Salessu was appointed bishop of the Malanje Diocese in 1977.  Bishop Salessu retired in 1998 and died on 20 January 2011.

Notes

20th-century Roman Catholic bishops in Angola
1923 births
2011 deaths
Roman Catholic bishops of Malanje